Ashbourne Green is an area of Derbyshire, England. It is located in the Peak District, 1 mile north-east of Ashbourne in the Offcote and Underwood parish.

The owner of The Green Hall residence in Ashbourne has traditionally held the freehold of Ashbourne Green, which is around 46 acres of common land.

References 

Parks and open spaces in Derbyshire